The 2021 IFSC Paraclimbing World Championships was the 7th edition of its kind. It was held in Moscow, Russia from 15 to 17 September 2021, alongside the 2021 IFSC Climbing World Championships, it included a total of 13 Lead events for the respective athlete's impairment classification.

Two venues were used during the championships: the Irina Viner-Usmanova Gymnastics Palace and the Athletics and Football Sport Complex "CSKA".

Medal table

Medal summary
The medals were awarded as follows:

References

IFSC Climbing World Championships
World Climbing Championships
IFSC
International sports competitions hosted by Russia
Sports competitions in Moscow
IFSC
2021 in Moscow